The 2002–03 Vancouver Canucks season was the Canucks' 33rd NHL season.

As of 2023, the only remaining active member of the 2002–03 Vancouver Canucks is Jan Hlaváč. He is a member of HC Stadion Vrchlabí of the 2nd Czech Republic Hockey League.

Offseason

Regular season
The Canucks had much success in the regular season as the West Coast Express Line (Brendan Morrison, Markus Naslund and Todd Bertuzzi) played their first full season intact and contributed 67% of the team's goals.  The Canucks led all teams in power-play goals scored, with 87. They also set a franchise record with a 10 game win streak in November 2002.  As the season wound down, many expected the Canucks to win the Northwest Division title (due to the slow start by division rivals Colorado Avalanche).  Despite the chances, the Canucks failed to clinch the Northwest division on the last day of the regular season with a 2-0 loss to the Los Angeles Kings coupled with a win by the Colorado Avalanche.  Markus Naslund also lost the Maurice "Rocket" Richard Trophy on the last day of the regular season and missed out on tying fellow Swede Hakan Loob as the only Swedish players who have scored 50 goals in a season.  Worse, Peter Forsberg also narrowly beat Naslund for the Art Ross Trophy.  Naslund publicly came out to apologize to Canuck fans for "choking".

Final standings

Playoffs

Schedule and results

Regular season

|- align="center" bgcolor="#CCFFCC"
|1||W||October 10, 2002||3–0 || align="left"| @ Calgary Flames (2002–03) ||1–0–0–0 || 
|- align="center" bgcolor="#CCFFCC"
|2||W||October 12, 2002||5–3 || align="left"|  San Jose Sharks (2002–03) ||2–0–0–0 || 
|- align="center" bgcolor="#FFBBBB"
|3||L||October 14, 2002||2–3 || align="left"|  Calgary Flames (2002–03) ||2–1–0–0 || 
|- align="center" bgcolor="#FFBBBB"
|4||L||October 16, 2002||3–6 || align="left"|  Boston Bruins (2002–03) ||2–2–0–0 || 
|- align="center"
|5||T||October 18, 2002||2–2 OT|| align="left"| @ Mighty Ducks of Anaheim (2002–03) ||2–2–1–0 || 
|- align="center"
|6||T||October 19, 2002||2–2 OT|| align="left"| @ Los Angeles Kings (2002–03) ||2–2–2–0 || 
|- align="center" bgcolor="#CCFFCC"
|7||W||October 21, 2002||5–2 || align="left"| @ San Jose Sharks (2002–03) ||3–2–2–0 || 
|- align="center"
|8||T||October 24, 2002||2–2 OT|| align="left"|  Mighty Ducks of Anaheim (2002–03) ||3–2–3–0 || 
|- align="center" bgcolor="#FFBBBB"
|9||L||October 26, 2002||1–4 || align="left"|  Dallas Stars (2002–03) ||3–3–3–0 || 
|- align="center"
|10||T||October 29, 2002||1–1 OT|| align="left"|  Buffalo Sabres (2002–03) ||3–3–4–0 || 
|- align="center" bgcolor="#FFBBBB"
|11||L||October 31, 2002||1–5 || align="left"|  Colorado Avalanche (2002–03) ||3–4–4–0 || 
|-

|- align="center" bgcolor="#CCFFCC"
|12||W||November 2, 2002||4–2 || align="left"| @ Minnesota Wild (2002–03) ||4–4–4–0 || 
|- align="center" bgcolor="#CCFFCC"
|13||W||November 4, 2002||4–2 || align="left"| @ Colorado Avalanche (2002–03) ||5–4–4–0 || 
|- align="center" bgcolor="#FFBBBB"
|14||L||November 6, 2002||0–4 || align="left"| @ Dallas Stars (2002–03) ||5–5–4–0 || 
|- align="center" bgcolor="#CCFFCC"
|15||W||November 9, 2002||5–2 || align="left"| @ Phoenix Coyotes (2002–03) ||6–5–4–0 || 
|- align="center" bgcolor="#CCFFCC"
|16||W||November 12, 2002||6–3 || align="left"|  St. Louis Blues (2002–03) ||7–5–4–0 || 
|- align="center" bgcolor="#CCFFCC"
|17||W||November 14, 2002||3–2 || align="left"|  Los Angeles Kings (2002–03) ||8–5–4–0 || 
|- align="center" bgcolor="#CCFFCC"
|18||W||November 16, 2002||3–1 || align="left"|  New York Rangers (2002–03) ||9–5–4–0 || 
|- align="center" bgcolor="#CCFFCC"
|19||W||November 20, 2002||5–3 || align="left"|  Chicago Blackhawks (2002–03) ||10–5–4–0 || 
|- align="center" bgcolor="#CCFFCC"
|20||W||November 22, 2002||4–1 || align="left"|  Detroit Red Wings (2002–03) ||11–5–4–0 || 
|- align="center" bgcolor="#CCFFCC"
|21||W||November 25, 2002||2–1 || align="left"| @ Minnesota Wild (2002–03) ||12–5–4–0 || 
|- align="center" bgcolor="#CCFFCC"
|22||W||November 27, 2002||3–2 || align="left"| @ Carolina Hurricanes (2002–03) ||13–5–4–0 || 
|- align="center" bgcolor="#CCFFCC"
|23||W||November 29, 2002||5–3 || align="left"| @ Tampa Bay Lightning (2002–03) ||14–5–4–0 || 
|- align="center" bgcolor="#CCFFCC"
|24||W||November 30, 2002||5–2 || align="left"| @ Florida Panthers (2002–03) ||15–5–4–0 || 
|-

|- align="center" bgcolor="#FFBBBB"
|25||L||December 3, 2002||1–2 || align="left"| @ New York Islanders (2002–03) ||15–6–4–0 || 
|- align="center" bgcolor="#CCFFCC"
|26||W||December 4, 2002||3–2 OT|| align="left"| @ New Jersey Devils (2002–03) ||16–6–4–0 || 
|- align="center" bgcolor="#FFBBBB"
|27||L||December 7, 2002||2–4 || align="left"|  Minnesota Wild (2002–03) ||16–7–4–0 || 
|- align="center" bgcolor="#FFBBBB"
|28||L||December 9, 2002||1–2 || align="left"|  Calgary Flames (2002–03) ||16–8–4–0 || 
|- align="center" bgcolor="#CCFFCC"
|29||W||December 11, 2002||3–1 || align="left"|  Colorado Avalanche (2002–03) ||17–8–4–0 || 
|- align="center" bgcolor="#CCFFCC"
|30||W||December 14, 2002||6–3 || align="left"| @ Edmonton Oilers (2002–03) ||18–8–4–0 || 
|- align="center"
|31||T||December 15, 2002||3–3 OT|| align="left"|  Calgary Flames (2002–03) ||18–8–5–0 || 
|- align="center" bgcolor="#FFBBBB"
|32||L||December 17, 2002||2–3 || align="left"| @ Chicago Blackhawks (2002–03) ||18–9–5–0 || 
|- align="center" bgcolor="#CCFFCC"
|33||W||December 19, 2002||3–1 || align="left"| @ Nashville Predators (2002–03) ||19–9–5–0 || 
|- align="center" bgcolor="#CCFFCC"
|34||W||December 21, 2002||4–3 OT|| align="left"|  Edmonton Oilers (2002–03) ||20–9–5–0 || 
|- align="center" bgcolor="#FFBBBB"
|35||L||December 23, 2002||3–5 || align="left"| @ Colorado Avalanche (2002–03) ||20–10–5–0 || 
|- align="center" bgcolor="#CCFFCC"
|36||W||December 26, 2002||4–2 || align="left"| @ Edmonton Oilers (2002–03) ||21–10–5–0 || 
|- align="center" bgcolor="#CCFFCC"
|37||W||December 28, 2002||7–3 || align="left"|  Mighty Ducks of Anaheim (2002–03) ||22–10–5–0 || 
|- align="center" bgcolor="#FFBBBB"
|38||L||December 31, 2002||3–5 || align="left"|  Toronto Maple Leafs (2002–03) ||22–11–5–0 || 
|-

|- align="center" bgcolor="#CCFFCC"
|39||W||January 2, 2003||3–2 || align="left"|  Montreal Canadiens (2002–03) ||23–11–5–0 || 
|- align="center" bgcolor="#CCFFCC"
|40||W||January 4, 2003||3–2 || align="left"|  Florida Panthers (2002–03) ||24–11–5–0 || 
|- align="center" bgcolor="#CCFFCC"
|41||W||January 8, 2003||6–4 || align="left"|  Ottawa Senators (2002–03) ||25–11–5–0 || 
|- align="center" bgcolor="#FFBBBB"
|42||L||January 10, 2003||2–3 || align="left"|  Columbus Blue Jackets (2002–03) ||25–12–5–0 || 
|- align="center" bgcolor="#FFBBBB"
|43||L||January 11, 2003||0–3 || align="left"| @ San Jose Sharks (2002–03) ||25–13–5–0 || 
|- align="center" bgcolor="#CCFFCC"
|44||W||January 14, 2003||4–3 || align="left"|  Nashville Predators (2002–03) ||26–13–5–0 || 
|- align="center" bgcolor="#FFBBBB"
|45||L||January 16, 2003||2–5 || align="left"| @ Minnesota Wild (2002–03) ||26–14–5–0 || 
|- align="center" bgcolor="#CCFFCC"
|46||W||January 17, 2003||4–2 || align="left"| @ Chicago Blackhawks (2002–03) ||27–14–5–0 || 
|- align="center" bgcolor="#CCFFCC"
|47||W||January 19, 2003||4–1 || align="left"| @ Detroit Red Wings (2002–03) ||28–14–5–0 || 
|- align="center" bgcolor="#FFBBBB"
|48||L||January 21, 2003||2–3 || align="left"| @ Nashville Predators (2002–03) ||28–15–5–0 || 
|- align="center" bgcolor="#FFBBBB"
|49||L||January 24, 2003||2–5 || align="left"|  Detroit Red Wings (2002–03) ||28–16–5–0 || 
|- align="center" bgcolor="#CCFFCC"
|50||W||January 26, 2003||1–0 || align="left"|  Phoenix Coyotes (2002–03) ||29–16–5–0 || 
|- align="center"
|51||T||January 28, 2003||2–2 OT|| align="left"|  Minnesota Wild (2002–03) ||29–16–6–0 || 
|- align="center"
|52||T||January 30, 2003||3–3 OT|| align="left"|  Edmonton Oilers (2002–03) ||29–16–7–0 || 
|-

|- align="center" bgcolor="#CCFFCC"
|53||W||February 4, 2003||3–2 || align="left"| @ Pittsburgh Penguins (2002–03) ||30–16–7–0 || 
|- align="center"
|54||T||February 5, 2003||4–4 OT|| align="left"| @ Columbus Blue Jackets (2002–03) ||30–16–8–0 || 
|- align="center" bgcolor="#CCFFCC"
|55||W||February 7, 2003||4–2 || align="left"| @ Buffalo Sabres (2002–03) ||31–16–8–0 || 
|- align="center" bgcolor="#CCFFCC"
|56||W||February 10, 2003||2–1 || align="left"|  Chicago Blackhawks (2002–03) ||32–16–8–0 || 
|- align="center" bgcolor="#CCFFCC"
|57||W||February 13, 2003||2–1 OT|| align="left"|  Colorado Avalanche (2002–03) ||33–16–8–0 || 
|- align="center"
|58||T||February 15, 2003||2–2 OT|| align="left"| @ Calgary Flames (2002–03) ||33–16–9–0 || 
|- align="center" bgcolor="#CCFFCC"
|59||W||February 18, 2003||4–3 OT|| align="left"| @ Detroit Red Wings (2002–03) ||34–16–9–0 || 
|- align="center" bgcolor="#CCFFCC"
|60||W||February 20, 2003||4–2 || align="left"| @ St. Louis Blues (2002–03) ||35–16–9–0 || 
|- align="center" bgcolor="#CCFFCC"
|61||W||February 22, 2003||3–2 OT|| align="left"| @ Edmonton Oilers (2002–03) ||36–16–9–0 || 
|- align="center" bgcolor="#CCFFCC"
|62||W||February 23, 2003||7–2 || align="left"|  Columbus Blue Jackets (2002–03) ||37–16–9–0 || 
|- align="center" bgcolor="#CCFFCC"
|63||W||February 25, 2003||8–0 || align="left"|  Atlanta Thrashers (2002–03) ||38–16–9–0 || 
|- align="center" bgcolor="#FFBBBB"
|64||L||February 27, 2003||2–3 || align="left"|  San Jose Sharks (2002–03) ||38–17–9–0 || 
|-

|- align="center"
|65||T||March 1, 2003||1–1 OT|| align="left"| @ Montreal Canadiens (2002–03) ||38–17–10–0 || 
|- align="center" bgcolor="#CCFFCC"
|66||W||March 3, 2003||6–4 || align="left"| @ Boston Bruins (2002–03) ||39–17–10–0 || 
|- align="center" bgcolor="#FFBBBB"
|67||L||March 4, 2003||0–3 || align="left"| @ Philadelphia Flyers (2002–03) ||39–18–10–0 || 
|- align="center" bgcolor="#FF6F6F"
|68||OTL||March 6, 2003||4–5 OT|| align="left"| @ Columbus Blue Jackets (2002–03) ||39–18–10–1 || 
|- align="center"
|69||T||March 8, 2003||3–3 OT|| align="left"| @ Toronto Maple Leafs (2002–03) ||39–18–11–1 || 
|- align="center" bgcolor="#CCFFCC"
|70||W||March 11, 2003||4–3 || align="left"|  New York Islanders (2002–03) ||40–18–11–1 || 
|- align="center"
|71||T||March 13, 2003||4–4 OT|| align="left"|  St. Louis Blues (2002–03) ||40–18–12–1 || 
|- align="center" bgcolor="#FFBBBB"
|72||L||March 15, 2003||0–1 || align="left"|  Toronto Maple Leafs (2002–03) ||40–19–12–1 || 
|- align="center" bgcolor="#CCFFCC"
|73||W||March 17, 2003||4–2 || align="left"| @ Dallas Stars (2002–03) ||41–19–12–1 || 
|- align="center" bgcolor="#FFBBBB"
|74||L||March 18, 2003||4–6 || align="left"| @ St. Louis Blues (2002–03) ||41–20–12–1 || 
|- align="center" bgcolor="#CCFFCC"
|75||W||March 20, 2003||7–3 || align="left"|  Nashville Predators (2002–03) ||42–20–12–1 || 
|- align="center" bgcolor="#CCFFCC"
|76||W||March 23, 2003||6–0 || align="left"|  Washington Capitals (2002–03) ||43–20–12–1 || 
|- align="center" bgcolor="#FFBBBB"
|77||L||March 25, 2003||3–4 || align="left"|  Dallas Stars (2002–03) ||43–21–12–1 || 
|- align="center" bgcolor="#CCFFCC"
|78||W||March 27, 2003||5–1 || align="left"|  Phoenix Coyotes (2002–03) ||44–21–12–1 || 
|- align="center" bgcolor="#CCFFCC"
|79||W||March 29, 2003||5–1 || align="left"| @ Los Angeles Kings (2002–03) ||45–21–12–1 || 
|- align="center" bgcolor="#FFBBBB"
|80||L||March 30, 2003||1–3 || align="left"| @ Mighty Ducks of Anaheim (2002–03) ||45–22–12–1 || 
|-

|- align="center"
|81||T||April 2, 2003||3–3 OT|| align="left"| @ Phoenix Coyotes (2002–03) ||45–22–13–1 || 
|- align="center" bgcolor="#FFBBBB"
|82||L||April 6, 2003||0–2 || align="left"|  Los Angeles Kings (2002–03) ||45–23–13–1 || 
|-

|-
| Legend:

Playoffs

|- style="text-align:center; background:#FFBBBB;"
| 1 || April 10 || St. Louis || 6–0 || Vancouver || || Cloutier || 18,514 || Blues lead 1–0 || 
|- style="text-align:center; background:#CCFFCC;"
| 2 || April 12 || St. Louis || 1–2 || Vancouver || || Cloutier || 18,514 || Series tied 1–1 || 
|- style="text-align:center; background:#FFBBBB;"
| 3 || April 14 || Vancouver || 1–3 || St. Louis || || Cloutier || 19,699 || Blues lead 2–1 || 
|- style="text-align:center; background:#FFBBBB;"
| 4 || April 16 || Vancouver || 1–4 || St. Louis || || Cloutier || 19,936 || Blues lead 3–1 || 
|- style="text-align:center; background:#CCFFCC;"
| 5 || April 18 || St. Louis || 3–5 || Vancouver || || Cloutier || 18,514 || Blues lead 3–2 || 
|- style="text-align:center; background:#CCFFCC;"
| 6 || April 20 || Vancouver || 4–3 || St. Louis || || Cloutier || 19,522 || Series tied 3–3 || 
|- style="text-align:center; background:#CCFFCC;"
| 7 || April 22 || St. Louis || 1–4 || Vancouver || || Cloutier || 18,514 || Canucks win 4–3 || 
|-

|- style="text-align:center; background:#CCFFCC;"
| 1 || April 25 || Minnesota || 3–4 || Vancouver || OT || Cloutier || 18,514 || Canucks lead 1–0 || 
|- style="text-align:center; background:#FFBBBB;"
| 2 || April 27 || Minnesota || 3–2 || Vancouver || || Cloutier || 18,514 || Series tied 1–1 || 
|- style="text-align:center; background:#CCFFCC;"
| 3 || April 29 || Vancouver || 3–2 || Minnesota || || Cloutier || 19,394 || Canucks lead 2–1 || 
|- style="text-align:center; background:#CCFFCC;"
| 4 || May 2 || Vancouver || 3–2 || Minnesota || OT || Cloutier || 19,386 || Canucks lead 3–1 || 
|- style="text-align:center; background:#FFBBBB;"
| 5 || May 5 || Minnesota || 7–2 || Vancouver || || Cloutier || 18,514 || Canucks lead 3–2 || 
|- style="text-align:center; background:#FFBBBB;"
| 6 || May 7 || Vancouver || 1–5 || Minnesota || || Cloutier || 19,350 || Series tied 3–3 || 
|- style="text-align:center; background:#FFBBBB;"
| 7 || May 8 || Minnesota || 4–2 || Vancouver || || Cloutier || 18,514 || Wild win 4–3 || 
|-

|-
| Legend:

Player statistics

Scoring
 Position abbreviations: C = Centre; D = Defence; G = Goaltender; LW = Left Wing; RW = Right Wing
  = Joined team via a transaction (e.g., trade, waivers, signing) during the season. Stats reflect time with the Canucks only.
  = Left team via a transaction (e.g., trade, waivers, release) during the season. Stats reflect time with the Canucks only.

Goaltending

Awards and records

Awards

Transactions
The Canucks were involved in the following transactions from June 14, 2002, the day after the deciding game of the 2002 Stanley Cup Finals, through June 9, 2003, the day of the deciding game of the 2003 Stanley Cup Finals.

Trades

Players acquired

Players lost

Signings

Draft picks

Below are the Vancouver Canucks' selections at the 2002 NHL Entry Draft which was held on June 22–23, 2002 at the Air Canada Centre in Toronto.

Draft notes
 The Canucks' first-round pick was involved in the trade detailed in Note A.
  The New York Islanders' second-round pick (previously acquired by the Washington Capitals) went to the Canucks as the result of a trade on November 10, 2001 that sent the Canucks' 2002 first-round pick and 2003 third-round pick to Washington in exchange for Trevor Linden and this pick.
  The Tampa Bay Lightning's third-round pick (previously acquired by the Philadelphia Flyers) went to the Canucks as the result of a trade on December 17, 2001 that sent Donald Brashear and the Canucks' 2002 sixth-round pick to Philadelphia in exchange for Jan Hlavac and this pick.
 The Canucks' third-round pick went to the Florida Panthers as the result of a trade on May 31, 2001 that sent Alex Auld to Vancouver in exchange for the Canucks' 2001 second-round pick and this pick.
  The Los Angeles Kings' third-round pick went to the Canucks as the result of a trade on February 15, 2001 that sent Felix Potvin to Los Angeles in exchange for this pick.
 The Canucks' sixth-round pick was involved in the trade detailed in Note B.
  The Canucks received a seventh-round pick from the National Hockey League as compensation for Group III free agent Bob Essensa.
  The Canucks received a ninth-round pick from the National Hockey League as compensation for Group III free agent Greg Hawgood.

See also
 2002–03 NHL season

Notes

References

Vancouver Canucks seasons
Vancouver C
Vancouver